Carlos Joseph (July 14, 1980 – January 12, 2021) was an American professional football player who was an offensive tackle. He played college football for the Miami Hurricanes. He was drafted by the San Diego Chargers of the National Football League (NFL) in the seventh round of the 2004 NFL Draft.

Career
Joseph attended Miami Edison High before going to the University of Miami. A Haitian American, he and his brother William, who played defensive tackle, were nicknamed the "Haitian Sensations" during their time together on the Hurricanes. Joseph was a backup to Bryant McKinnie at left tackle on their national championship team in 2001. He became a starter as a junior in 2002, when he was a second-team all-conference selection in the Big East.

Coming out of UM, Joseph was not expected to contribute immediately for San Diego. The Chargers signed him to a three-year contract. Joseph was among San Diego's final round of cuts in the preseason, but he was signed the following day to their practice squad for 2004. He was cut the following preseason before their final exhibition game in 2005.

In 2006, Joseph was signed by the Jacksonville Jaguars, who assigned him to NFL Europe, where he played for the Berlin Thunder. The Jaguars released him in August.

Personal life
Joseph's brother William became an NFL player.

Joseph died on January 12, 2021, of a brain aneurysm. He was 40.

References

1980 births
2021 deaths
Players of American football from Miami
Miami Edison Senior High School alumni
Berlin Thunder players
Jacksonville Jaguars players
Las Vegas Gladiators players
San Diego Chargers players
American sportspeople of Haitian descent
Cologne Centurions (NFL Europe) players
Manchester Wolves players
Deaths from intracranial aneurysm
American expatriate sportspeople in Germany
American expatriate players of American football